Gabriele Morelli (Montichiari, 29 June 1988) is a retired Italian rugby union player.
His usual position was a Hooker and he played for Calvisano in Top12.

For 2015–16 Pro12 season, Morelli was an Additional Player for Zebre.

In 2008, he was also named in the Italy Under 20 and in 2012 in the Emerging Italy squad.

References

External links 
It's Rugby England Profile
Ultimate Rugby Profile

Sportspeople from the Province of Brescia
Italian rugby union players
Zebre Parma players
1988 births
Living people
Rugby union hookers
Rugby Calvisano players